Plinthograptis pleroma is a species of moth of the family Tortricidae. It is found in Nigeria.

The length of the forewings is about 5 mm. The ground colour of the forewings is grey, with the costa and terminal pattern orange with a rust hue, both spotted with brown. There are well-developed tornal and terminal blotches and there is a red pattern. The hindwings are dark brown-grey.

References

Endemic fauna of Nigeria
Moths described in 1981
Tortricini
Moths of Africa
Taxa named by Józef Razowski